Finley Thomas Shrimpton is an English professional footballer who plays as a midfielder for  club Scunthorpe United.

Playing career
In November 2017, Shrimpton joined the Scunthorpe United U16 side following his release from Barnsley. He signed his first professional contract with Scunthorpe in the summer of 2020.

In September 2020, Shrimpton joined Frickley Athletic on loan. He made eight appearances in all competitions for the club.

Shrimpton made his professional debut on 24 August 2021 coming on as a substitute for Scunthorpe in an EFL Trophy defeat against Manchester City U23s.

At the end of the 2021–22 season, Scunthorpe exercised the one-year extension option on his contract.

On 7 September 2021, Shrimpton joined Northern Premier League club Grantham Town on loan until January 2022. Shrimpton made 19 league appearances for Grantham and also featured for the club in the FA Trophy. Shrimpton again went out loan in March 2022, this time in Cleethorpes Town for the remainder of the 2021–22 season. However, in April 2022, Shrimpton was recalled to Scunthorpe. He played four times for Cleethorpes. A day after his return to Scunthorpe, Shrimpton made his first league appearance for the club starting in a 4–0 defeat to Mansfield Town.

On 13 September 2022, Shrimpton signed on a one-month loan for Gainsborough Trinity. The deal was later extended by a further month. Shrimpton returned to his parent club on 8 December 2022.

References

External links

2002 births
Living people
English footballers
Sportspeople from Scunthorpe
Association football midfielders
Scunthorpe United F.C. players
Frickley Athletic F.C. players
Grantham Town F.C. players
Cleethorpes Town F.C. players
Gainsborough Trinity F.C. players
English Football League players
Northern Premier League players